St. Croix River Light is a lighthouse on the St. Croix River, Maine, close to the Canada–United States border. It was first established in 1857. An octagonal wood tower on top of a keeper's house was built in 1901 and was destroyed by fire in 1976.  The present skeleton tower was built following the fire.

References

Lighthouses completed in 1857
Lighthouses completed in 1901
Lighthouses completed in 1976
Lighthouses in Washington County, Maine
1857 establishments in Maine